Sue Harrison (born 6 August 1971 in Royal Leamington Spa, England) is a British international long distance athlete.

Harrison joined her local club Leamington C&AC in 1986, firstly as a cross country runner, a discipline she first represented England at in 1993.

References

External links
Harrison's blog
Harrison's Twitter account

1971 births
Living people
Sportspeople from Leamington Spa
British female long-distance runners
20th-century British women
21st-century British women